Kurt Hartung (born 17 April 1925) was a German long-distance runner. He competed in the marathon at the 1956 Summer Olympics.

References

External links
 

1925 births
Possibly living people
Athletes (track and field) at the 1956 Summer Olympics
German male long-distance runners
German male marathon runners
Olympic athletes of the United Team of Germany
People from Waldheim, Saxony
Olympic male marathon runners
Sportspeople from Saxony